Kristýna Plíšková was the defending champion, winning the last edition of the tournament in 2014, however she chose not to participate.

Alison Van Uytvanck won the title, defeating Arina Rodionova in the final, 6–0, 6–4.

Seeds

Draw

Finals

Top half

Bottom half

References

External Links
Main Draw

Nottingham Trophy - Singles